The 2000 Fresno State Bulldogs football team represented California State University, Fresno as a member of the Western Athletic Conference (WAC) during the 2000 NCAA Division I-A football season. Led by fourth-year head coach Pat Hill, the Bulldogs compiled an overall record of 7–5 with a mark of 6–2 in conference play, placing third in the WAC. Fresno State was invited to the Silicon Valley Football Classic, where they lost to Air Force. The Bulldogs played their home games at Bulldog Stadium in Fresno, California.

Schedule

References

Fresno State
Fresno State Bulldogs football seasons
Fresno State Bulldogs football